Cry is a studio album by country music legend Lynn Anderson, released in 1972.

This album was based on Lynn Anderson's hit from early 1972, "Cry", which hit No. 3 on the Billboard Country charts, and No. 1 on the Cashbox Country charts. In addition the song also reached No. 71 on the Pop charts, and No. 16 on the Adult Contemporary charts that year. This album shows Anderson's new direction into placing her voice into more pop-oriented songs, including "Cry" (originally a No. 1 pop hit for Johnnie Ray in 1951). After having a No. 1 country and pop hit in late 1970, "(I Never Promised You a) Rose Garden", her record company set her records out more for the Pop market, and never looked back. This helped Lynn Anderson gain the biggest success she ever had for a number of years. Thus, this left Anderson from recording the hard country material she recorded for her late 1960s albums under Chart Records.

Husband Glenn Sutton helped produce this album with producing legend, Clive Davis. Most of the songs featured here are pop songs, like the Addrisi Brothers' "We've Got to Get It on Again" and Sonny & Cher's "When You Say Love". With the help of legendary country producer, Billy Sherrill, Sutton wrote some of the songs for this album, some of which had been previously hits for country singers, like Barbara Mandrell's "Tonight My Baby's Coming Home". This album was big-selling album, reaching No. 2 on the "Top Country Albums" chart and No. 114 on the "Billboard 200" albums chart.

Track listing

Personnel
Lynn Anderson – Vocals
Louis Bradley – Engineer
Charlie Bragg – Engineer
The Jordanaires – Background Vocals 
Cam Mullins – Arranger
The Nashville Edition – Background Vocals 
Glenn Sutton – Arranger

Charts

Weekly charts

Year-end charts

References

1972 albums
Lynn Anderson albums
Albums produced by Clive Davis
Albums produced by Glenn Sutton
Columbia Records albums